Subdromomeryx is an extinct genus of Artiodactyla, of the family Palaeomerycidae, endemic to North America.

References 

Palaeomerycidae
Miocene even-toed ungulates
Miocene genus extinctions
Miocene mammals of North America
Prehistoric even-toed ungulate genera
Fossil taxa described in 1894